The Worcester Park Challenge Cup  was an early Victorian era men's tennis tournament played at Worcester, Worcestershire, England. It was played on grass courts and ran for four editions from 1879 to 1882.

History
The Worcester Park Challenge Cup was an early 19th century tennis event first staged end the first week July 1879 at Worcester, Worcestershire, England. The first winner of the men's singles was Britain's Mr F. Durant of the Cheam Club, he went onto win the title for three consecutive years. 

A description of the event that concluded on 10 June 1882.
.

It was a featured regular series event on the Men's Amateur Tour (1877-1912).

References

Sources
 Nieuwland, Alex (2011–2022). "Tournament – Worcester Park LTC". www.tennisarchives.com. Tennis Archives.
 Norham Gardens LTC. Oxford. Oxfordshire. England. www.norham.org.uk. 
 Routledge's Sporting Annual (1883). George Routledge and Sons. London.

Grass court tennis tournaments
Defunct tennis tournaments in the United Kingdom
Tennis tournaments in England